Julian Hazel (born 25 September 1973) is an English former football player and manager who played in the Football League as a forward for Colchester United. He was manager of Wivenhoe Town.

Career

Born in Luton, Hazel joined Conference club Colchester United as an apprentice, making his first-team debut in an FA Trophy first round replay 3–2 victory at Kingstonian on 14 January 1992, coming on as a substitute for Steve Restarick. He made one further appearance in the 1991–92 season, again as a substitute in the FA Trophy for Ian Stewart in a third round 3–1 home win against Morecambe.

Hazel appeared twice in the Football League following Colchester's non-league double of the Conference title and FA Trophy, playing in two games for the club, the first of which came during a 3–0 home defeat to Darlington on 29 August 1992. He made his final appearance for the U's on 1 September 1992 in a 2–0 home defeat by Shrewsbury Town.

On leaving Colchester, Hazel joined Chelmsford City and later Braintree Town. He signed for Wivenhoe Town following those spells and was appointed player-manager in the summer of 1998 becoming the youngest manager in senior football at the time, leading the club to a 17th position finish in his first season in charge, and a 6th-placed finish in his second, narrowly missing out on promotion.

References

1973 births
Living people
Footballers from Luton
English footballers
Association football forwards
Colchester United F.C. players
Chelmsford City F.C. players
Braintree Town F.C. players
Wivenhoe Town F.C. players
Romford F.C. players
Harwich & Parkeston F.C. players
Stanway Rovers F.C. players
Heybridge Swifts F.C. players
English Football League players
Isthmian League players
English football managers
Wivenhoe Town F.C. managers
Isthmian League managers